The Air Force Medical University, formerly known as the Fourth Military Medical University until 2017, is a Chinese military institution of higher learning, affiliated to the People's Liberation Army Air Force.

It was formed by the merger of former Fourth Military Medical University (First Military Medical College) and Fifth Military Medical University (Third Military Medical College ). The predecessor of Fifth Military Medical University is the "Medicine School of National Central University", which was the best medicine school in China, founded in Nanjing in 1935. It was renamed the "Medicine School of Nanjing University" in 1949, and renamed "Eastern Military Medical College" and then "Third Military Medical College" and "Fifth Military Medical University" in 1952. The "People's Medical College of Northwestern Military Region", the predecessor of former Fourth Military Medical University was founded in 1941, relocated in Xi'an in 1948, and renamed "Northwestern Military Medical College" and then "First Military Medical College" and "Fourth Military Medical University" in 1952. The two medical universities were merged to form the new Fourth Military Medical University affiliated to PLA in 1954 in Xi'an, the capital of Shaanxi Province, China. It is a Chinese Ministry of Education Double First Class Discipline University, with Double First Class status in certain disciplines.

References

External links

Military education and training in China
Universities and colleges in Xi'an
Medical schools in China
People's Liberation Army Air Force
1941 establishments in China
Educational institutions established in 1941